Viet Cong is the debut studio album by Canadian rock band Viet Cong. It was released on January 20, 2015, by Flemish Eye in Canada and Jagjaguwar internationally. Viet Cong is the only album released by the band under this name, as they changed their name to Preoccupations in 2016.

The first single from the album, "Continental Shelf", was released for streaming on October 15, 2014. The album also features a re-recorded version of a previous song, "Bunker Buster". The band embarked on a North American and European tour in support of the album.

Production
The album was recorded during 2014 at The Barn Window Studio, Lost Cause Studios, Basketball 4 Life and Monty's Place.

Critical reception

Upon its release, Viet Cong received mainly positive reviews from music critics. At Metacritic, which assigns a normalized rating out of 100 to reviews from mainstream critics, the album has received an average score of 77, based on 23 reviews, indicating "generally favourable reviews". Writing for Exclaim!, Cam Lindsay noted that "Viet Cong maintains the same shadowy, droning tones that haunted Cassette, only taking them deeper into the abyss".

Accolades
The album was a shortlisted nominee for the 2015 Polaris Music Prize.

Track listing

Personnel
Viet Cong
Matt Flegel – bass guitar, vocals
Mike Wallace – drums
Scott Munro – guitar
Daniel Christiansen – guitar

References

2015 debut albums
Preoccupations albums
Flemish Eye albums
Jagjaguwar albums